Nikita Gennadievich Tyagunov (born 7 February 1953 in Moscow, died 20 July 1992 in Moscow) was a Soviet Russian film and theatrical director, whose film Noga (1991) won numerous awards, including FIPRESCI Award. He also directed and made TV films before 1990.

Filmography
 1983 — June, Moscow, Chertanovo
 1984 — Isaac Babel's Odessa Stories  
 1985 — Someone Мust… 
 1986 — Your Daughter Alexandra 
 1986 — Children of Discord 
 1986 — Goldfish 
 1987 — And again,  Krizhevsky 
 1989 — Jubilee Tango 
 1991 — Leg

References

External links 
 
 Причина смерти Никиты Тягунова

Soviet film directors
Mass media people from Moscow
1953 births
1992 deaths
Burials at Pyatnitskoye Cemetery